Newsom–Marr Farm, also known as Shady Lane Farm, is a historic home and farm located at Sand Creek Township, Bartholomew County, Indiana. The house was built in 1864, and is a -story, three bay, Italianate style brick dwelling with a side-gable roof.  Also on the property are the contributing Midwest three portal barn (c. 1860), wagon shed (c. 1860), traverse-frame barn (c. 1910), and wash house (c. 1917). 

It was listed on the National Register of Historic Places in 2002. One notable member of the family was Vida Newsom, suffragist and clubwoman.

References

Farms on the National Register of Historic Places in Indiana
Federal architecture in Indiana
Italianate architecture in Indiana
Houses completed in 1864
Buildings and structures in Bartholomew County, Indiana
National Register of Historic Places in Bartholomew County, Indiana